Li Nan is a table tennis player from China. From 2000 to 2003 she won several medals in the World Table Tennis Championships and the Asian Championships.

See also
 List of table tennis players

References

Chinese female table tennis players
Living people
Table tennis players at the 2002 Asian Games
Asian Games medalists in table tennis
Year of birth missing (living people)
Table tennis players from Tianjin
Medalists at the 2002 Asian Games
Asian Games silver medalists for China
Asian Games bronze medalists for China